Ivar Tenisovich Smilga (2 December 1892 – 10 January 1938) was a Latvian Bolshevik leader, Soviet politician and economist. He was a member of the Left Opposition in the Soviet Union.

Early life 
Ivar was born in Aloja in the Governorate of Livonia (modern Latvia), to parents he described as "land-owning farmers" and "highly intellectual.". His father played an active part in the 1905 Revolution, and was elected Chairman of the Revolutionary Administrative Committee for his district.  
In 1906, Tenis Smilga was caught and killed by a punitive expedition sent to crush the revolt in Livonia.

Revolutionary career 
Smilga joined the Russian Social Democratic Labour Party (RSDLP) as a 14 year schoolboy, in January 1907, and was arrested for the first time during a May Day demonstration that year. In 1910, he was again arrested for taking part in a student demonstration in Moscow to mark the death of Leo Tolstoy, calling for the abolition of the death penalty, but was released after one month in prison. He was rearrested in July 1911, as a member of the illegal RSDLP organisation in the Lefortovo District, held in custody for three months, then deported to Vologda for three years. He returned in 1914, after the outbreak of the First world war, and joined the Petrograd Bolshevik party committee. Rearrested in May 1915, he was sentenced to three years deportation in Yeniseysk.

Role in 1917 
Freed as a result of the February Revolution, Smilga returned to Petrograd, and became a leading figure in the Bolshevik organisation in the Kronstadt naval base. In May, he was Kronstadt's delegate to the Seventh Conference of the Bolshevik faction of the RSDLP, at which, despite his being only 24 years old, former fellow Siberian exiles put him forward as a member of the nine-member Central Committee. During 1917, he was Vladimir Lenin's most consistent ally and supporter in calling for a second revolution led by the Bolsheviks. In June, Lenin and Smilga submitted their resignations from the Central Committee after the majority agreed to call off an anti-government demonstration due to be held on 10 June, but both resignations were rejected. Smilga had wanted the demonstration to escalate into a revolutionary crisis in which power would be seized by the First Congress of Soviets, then in sessions, and urged that they should not "hesitate to seize the Post Office, telegraph and arsenal, if events developed" - but the Congress, which was dominated by supporters of the Kerensky government, insisted on the demonstration being called off.

During the Sixth Congress of the Bolshevik party, in August 1917, Smilga declared that the soviets had "committed suicide" by not opposing the government, and that the party should be ready to seize power alone. "No-one has the right to deprive us of this initiative if fate gives us another chance," he declared. Responding to a fellow Bolshevik who had urged caution, he said: "Let me remind him of Danton's words: 'In revolution, one needs boldness, boldness, and more boldness!"

In September, Smilga led the Bolshevik delegation at the Third Regional Congress of Soviets in Helsingfors (Helsinki)- the capital of Finland, which was then under Russian rule - and was elected Chairman of the Regional Committee of the Soviets, a position carrying real power because of the collapse of the government authority in the wake of the Kornilov affair. Lenin was then hiding in Helsingfors, and "entered into a sort of conspiracy with Smilga", sending a long and angry letter on 27 September complaining that their fellow Bolsheviks were "passing resolutions" instead of "preparing their armed forces for the overthrow of Kerensky." In mid-October, Smilga returned to Petrograd for the Congress of Northern Region Soviets, and stayed to help plan the Bolsheviks seizure of power. Just before the October Revolution, he was sent back to Finland with orders to send  1500 armed sailors to Petrograd to act as reserves in case any troops from the front came to attack the city.

Political career 

Smilga returned to Petrograd in January 1918, after the Bolsheviks had been routed in the brief civil war that led to the creation of an independent Finland, and served as a member of the praesidium of the Petrograd soviet and an editor of the Bolshevik newspaper Petrogradskaya Pravda. He consistently backed Lenin's line over whether to sign the Treaty of Brest-Litovsk, which ended the war with Germany. He was transferred to political work in the Red Army at the start of the Russian Civil War, and acted as a political commissar on every major front. He was chief political commissar on the southern front, for the campaign against the army of General Denikin. In January 1921, he was appointed political commissar on the Causasus front, and head of the Caucasian Labour Army.

Relations with Trotsky 
During the early part of 1919, Smilga was involved in a conflict over conduct of the civil war, which saw him aligned with Iosif Stalin against Leon Trotsky the People's Commissar for War and future leader of the Left Opposition. Smilga, Mikhail Lashevich and Sergei Gusev were political commissars on the Eastern Front, fighting the army of Admiral Kolchak. The military commander was Sergei Kamenev, a former Colonel in the Imperial Army. The Red Army commander in chief  Ioakhim Vatzetis wanted them to halt operations once they had driven Kolchak's army east of the Urals, rather than risk pursuing him into Siberia. Trotsky supported him. Smilga, Lashevich and Kamenev insisted on continuing the offensive, which was a spectacular success. In May, Smilga was appointed head of the Political Directorate of the Red Army. With Stalin's support, he proposed that Kamenev should replace Vatzetis as commander in chief, against Trotsky's advice. After Lenin had overruled Trotsky, in July 1919, Smilga, Gusev and Kamenev joined Trotsky on the six-member Revolutionary Council of War.

Relations with Stalin 

During the war between Russia and Poland, in 1920, Smilga headed the Revolutionary Military Council of the Western Front, whose military commander was Mikhail Tukhachevsky. When the Red Army met unexpectedly strong resistance as it reached the outskirts of Warsaw, Tukhachevsky ordered the Southwestern front to turn northwards, but Stalin, who was the front's political commissar, refused, preferring to capture Lwow. At the Tenth party congress in March 1921, there was a secret session on why Russia lost the war, at which - according to Trotsky - "Stalin came out with the declaration, equally startling in its viciousness and untruthfulness, that Smilga...had 'deceived the Central Committee' by 'promising' to take Warsaw by a definite date...I protested on the spot against this startling insinuation: Smilga's 'promise' meant merely that he had hoped to take Warsaw."

Post-war career 
Smilga was dropped from the Central Committee in March 1921. Soon afterwards, he was appointed head of the Main Directorate for Fuel. He was also vice-chairman of the Vesenkha from 1921 to 1928, and of the Gosplan from 1924 to 1926. From 1925, he was a prominent supporter of the Left Opposition, one of only half a dozen oppositionists elected a full member of the Central Committee in December 1925 - despite the fact that in August 1925, Stalin complained about Smilga's influence in Gosplan and denounced him as a "fake economic leader." He was dismissed in June 1927 and transferred to Khabarovsk, in Siberia. His departure was the occasion for the last public demonstration against the Stalin regime, in which about a thousand people gathered at the railway to show solidarity.

Smilga was expelled from the Central Committee on 14 November 1927, expelled from the communist party in December, and deported to a remote area of Siberia. In July 1929, along with Yevgeni Preobrazhensky, Karl Radek, he renounced his support for the Left Opposition, citing the reason that Joseph Stalin's rise would have meant the application of much of the Left's recommended policies, and that the dangers the Soviet state faced, from the outside as well as from within, required their "return to the Party". About 400 other deportees followed their lead. His membership of the communist party was restored in 1930, and he was allowed to return to economic work. Trotskyist historian Pierre Broué suspected he was a member of the secret opposition bloc Trotsky, Zinoviev and Kamenev had created in 1932.

Arrest and execution 
Smilga was arrested on the night of 1–2 January 1935, in the wake of Sergei Kirov's assassination, and sentenced to five years imprisonment. He was held for months in an isolator in Verkhneuralsk. At the first of three Moscow show trials, in August 1936, the lead defendant Grigory Zinoviev named Smilga as having been implicated in the 'Trotskyite-Zinovievite Terrorist Centre'. It later emerged in Trotsky's letters that Zinoviev and Trotskyists had indeed formed a secret alliance, but there was no evidence of terrorist activity in them. Unlike almost all the other eminent Old Bolsheviks named during the proceedings, he was never subjected to a public trial, suggesting that the NKVD had not been able to break his spirit sufficiently to be able to rely on him to confess. He was shot in February 1938.

Personality 
A scientist working in Russia in the 1920s, who had no reason to speak well of Smilga, and in face held him responsible for the execution of a group of technicians from the former Nobel company during the civil war, nevertheless believed that he should have been appointed head of Vesenkha. "He seemed to me quite superior to all other members of the Praesidium...He was well educated, with vigorous and pleasant features, and authoritative in speech and action...he impressed me favourably by his frankness and the fearless way he expressed his convictions, even when they were quite the opposite of those of his party colleagues." Viktor Serge, a fellow supporter of the left opposition, described Smilga as "a fair-haired intellectual with spectacles, a chin-beard, and thinning front, ordinary to look at and distinctly the armchair sort."

Smilga was posthumously rehabilitated in 1987.

References

External links
 Biography 
 Interview with Tatiana Smilga-Poluyan
 Leaders of the Russian Revolution: Ivar Tenisovich Smilga (1892-1937)

1892 births
1938 deaths
People from Aloja, Latvia
People from Kreis Wolmar
Old Bolsheviks
Central Committee of the Communist Party of the Soviet Union members
Left Opposition
Trotskyists
Russian Constituent Assembly members
Soviet military personnel of the Polish–Soviet War
Great Purge victims from Latvia
People executed by the Soviet Union by firearm
Soviet rehabilitations